Joseph Nicholson may refer to:

Joseph Nicholson (public official), Maryland politician
Joseph Hopper Nicholson (1770–1817), early Maryland attorney
Joseph Shield Nicholson (1850–1927), English economist
Joe Nicholson (1898–1974), English footballer

See also
Joseph Nicholson Barney (1818–1899), United States Navy officer
Joseph Nicolson (disambiguation)
Nicholson (name)